Air Marshal Brijesh Dhar Jayal PVSM AVSM VM and Bar is a retired officer of the Indian Air Force, who served in the appointment of Air Officer Commanding-in-Chief of the South Western Air Command from 1992 to 1993. He was awarded the Param Vishisht Seva Medal and Ati Vishisht Seva Medal. Jayal went to The Doon School and was later trained as a test pilot at the Empire Test Pilots' School, UK.

References 

1935 births
Living people
Indian aviators
Indian Air Force air marshals
Indian Air Force officers
Indian test pilots
Recipients of the Param Vishisht Seva Medal
Recipients of the Ati Vishisht Seva Medal
The Doon School alumni
Military personnel from Uttarakhand